Banyabong is a mountain of Jeollabuk-do, western South Korea. It has an altitude of 1732 metres.

See also
List of mountains of Korea

References

Mountains of South Korea
Mountains of North Jeolla Province